The following is a list of prominent Indigenous Australian people of Noongar identity, who are from the south-west corner of Western Australia.

Activists
Corina Abraham
Robert Bropho
Bessie Flower
Clarrie Isaacs
Mervyn Eades
Megan Krakouer

Artists
Sharyn Egan
Laurel Nannup
Shane Pickett
Tjyllyungoo
Ken Farmer

Authors
Charmaine Bennell
Eddie Bennell
Claire G. Coleman
Glenys Collard
Graeme Dixon (poet)
Kim Scott
Archie Weller

Elders
Ken Colbung
Leonard Collard
Midgegooroo
Ben Cuimermara Taylor
Angus Wallam
Yellagonga
Eugene Eades
Elvie Eades 
Trevor Eades

Resistance fighters
Calyute
Yagan

Sportspeople
Shai Bolton
Barry Cable
Cyril Collard
Graham Farmer
Kylie Farmer
Lance Franklin
Jonathon Griffin
Paddy Ryder
Nicky Winmar
Shane Yarran
Lydia Williams
Jeff Farmer
Andrew Krakouer
Brandon Ogilvie
Marlion Pickett
Shannon Cox
Austin Eades
Tony Jones
Harley Bennell
Nathan Krakouer
Phil Krakouer 
Jimmy Krakouer
Arthur Jones
Chris Yarran

Other
Fanny Balbuk
Shareena Clanton
Karla Hart
Carol Martin
Mohammed Junaid Thorne
Mokare
Della Rae Morrison
Angela Ryder
Ken Wyatt
Dorinda Cox

 
Indigenous Australia-related lists